John L. Outlaw (born January 8, 1945) was a former American football defensive back in the National Football League for the Boston/New England Patriots and the Philadelphia Eagles.  He also played in the American Football League for the Patriots.  Outlaw played college football at Jackson State University and was selected in the tenth round of the 1968 AFL Draft.

See also
Other American Football League players

References

1945 births
Living people
Sportspeople from Clarksdale, Mississippi
Players of American football from Mississippi
American football cornerbacks
American football safeties
Boston Patriots players
New England Patriots players
Philadelphia Eagles players
Jackson State Tigers football players
American Football League players